'Frisco Mabel Joy is a 1971 studio album by singer-songwriter Mickey Newbury. This was the second of three albums Newbury recorded at Cinderella Sound. The album includes the original version of "An American Trilogy", which Elvis Presley later performed in his Las Vegas shows with much success. "How Many Times (Must the Piper Be Paid for His Song)" is a dramatically re-imagined version of a song first released on Harlequin Melodies, Newbury's RCA debut. Other standout tracks include "The Future's Not What It Used to Be", "Remember the Good", "Frisco Depot", and "How I Love Them Old Songs". The track "San Francisco Mabel Joy" was not initially part of the album, though it is included on some versions.
’Frisco Mabel Joy was collected for CD issue on the eight-disc Mickey Newbury Collection from Mountain Retreat, Newbury's own label in the mid-1990s, along with nine other Newbury albums from 1969 to 1981. In 2011, it was reissued again, both separately and as part of the four-disc Mickey Newbury box set An American Trilogy, alongside two other albums recorded at Cinderella Sound, Looks Like Rain and Heaven Help the Child. This release marks the first time that 'Frisco Mabel Joy has been released on CD in remastered form, after the original master tapes (long thought to have been destroyed in a fire) were rediscovered in 2010.

Track listing
All songs written by Mickey Newbury, except where noted.
 "An American Trilogy" (Newbury/traditional) – 4:50
 "How Many Times (Must the Piper Be Paid for His Song)" – 5:48
 "Interlude" – 1:44
 "The Future's Not What It Used to Be" – 4:14
 "Mobile Blue" – 2:48
 "Frisco Depot" – 3:38
 "You're Not My Same Sweet Baby" – 3:46
 "Interlude" – 1:05
 "Remember the Good" – 2:57
 "Swiss Cottage Place" – 3:10
 "How I Love Them Old Songs" – 3:50
 "San Francisco Mabel Joy" – 5:17

Personnel 
 Mickey Newbury – guitar, lead vocals
 Dennis Linde – guitar, backing vocals
 Charlie McCoy – guitar, harmonica
 Bobby Thompson – banjo, guitar
 Wayne Moss – guitar
 Weldon Myrick – steel guitar
 Beegie Adair – keyboards
 Jimmy Capps – guitar
 Jim Isbell – drums
 Buddy Spicher – drums
 Farrell Morris – percussion
 Bob Beckham
 John Harris
 John Moss
 Charles Navarro
 Walker Sill

Production 
 Producer: Dennis Linde/Owsley Manier/Robert Rosemurgy
 Recording Engineer: Wayne Linde/Wayne Moss
 Art Direction: Robert L. Heimall
 Photography: Robert L. Heimall
 Liner Notes: unknown

Charts 
 Album
Billboard (North America)

 Single

Selected cover recordings 
"San Francisco Mabel Joy" was covered by folk singer Joan Baez on her 1971 album Blessed Are....
 John Denver recorded "San Francisco Mabel Joy" on his 1981 album Some Days Are Diamonds.
 Elvis Presley made "An American Trilogy" a part of his Las Vegas shows in 1972, and his version was included on live albums Elvis: As Recorded at Madison Square Garden (1972), Aloha From Hawaii: Via Satellite (1973), Elvis: As Recorded Live on Stage in Memphis (1974), and Elvis' 1972 documentary Elvis on Tour. The song is largely associated with Presley's interpretation, though in execution it is substantively different from Newbury's original version.
 "How I Love Them Old Songs" has merited over thirty different cover versions including recordings by Gene Vincent, Carol Channing, Bill Monroe, and Don Gibson. Mickey Gilley recorded the song on his 1975 album Movin' On, and it was recorded by Tompall Glaser on his 1977 album The Wonder of It All.
 "Remember The Good" has been recorded by Eddy Arnold, Roy Orbison, Brook Benton, and Glenn Yarbrough, among others.
 "Frisco Depot" was recorded by Waylon Jennings in 1972 prior to his breakthrough Lonesome, On'ry and Mean which included Newbury's "San Francisco Mabel Joy" (Jennings has also recorded this album's "Mobile Blue" and "You're Not My Same Sweet Baby"). Robert Forster included "Frisco Depot" on his 1995 covers album I Had a New York Girlfriend. The song has also been covered by Roberta Flack and Ronny Cox.
 Roger Miller recorded "Swiss Cottage Place" prior to the release of Newbury's LP.
 Ronnie Milsap recorded a version of "The Future's Not What It Used To Be" in 1977.
 In 2000 Peter Blackstock, the founder of No Depression magazine, organized a multi-artist tribute that recreated the entire album titled Frisco Mabel Joy Revisited. Artists that participated in the recording include Dave Alvin performing "Mobile Blue," Michael Fracasso's "Remember The Good," and Kris Kristofferson recording "San Francisco Mabel Joy".
 Manowar included "An American Trilogy" on their 2002 album Warriors of the World

References 

 
 Mickey Newbury Website
 Mickey Newbury: Songs Covered By Over 1,100 Artists

Mickey Newbury albums
1971 albums
Elektra Records albums
Albums produced by Dennis Lindle